The Royal Ballet of Flanders is a dance company based in Antwerp, Belgium, specializing in classical, neoclassical and contemporary ballet. In its current incarnation, the company was established in 1969. It tours internationally.

History
The current Royal Ballet of Flanders was established by Belgium's federal Ministry of Dutch Culture in 1969. The Ballet royale de Wallonie, founded in 1966, was brought under the direction of Frédéric Flamand in 1991, who renamed the company Charleroi/Danse and shifted the focus of the troupe entirely onto modern dance.

Jeanne Brabants was the founder and original artistic director of the Royal Ballet of Flanders. She was succeeded as artistic director by Rus Valery Panov, then Robert Denvers.

In September 2012, Assis Carreiro was appointed Artistic Director of the Royal Ballet of Flanders and since her arrival has commissioned and produced works by Wayne McGregor, Jacopo Godani, Edward Clug, Glen Tetley, Ashley Page, among others. Previous Artistic Director Kathryn Bennetts took her post in 2005 and raised the company's international profile by adding contemporary works including those of William Forsythe to its repertoire and touring more extensively. Winning the Laurence Olivier Award for Outstanding Achievement in Dance in the category Dance Companies under her direction in 2009 as well as the London Circle Critics National Dance Award in 2012 for Outstanding company during her last season made the company an award-winning company, it has since been described as "today one of the best companies in Europe".

In the 2014 New Year Honours list, Assis Carreiro was appointed a MBE by Queen Elizabeth II of the United Kingdom.

In September 2015 Antwerp based choreographer Sidi Larbi Cherkaoui took the new artistic directorship, along with co-director Tamas Moricz (William Forsythe dancer). Together they became the new artistic co-directors to a reforming Ballet of Flanders under the new aegis of the opera ballet Kunsthuis. The company repertoire has been since shifting to a predominantly contemporary mix of dance works, focusing on new works by Cherkaoui and touring.

Notable dancers
Bernice Coppieters
Drew Jacoby
Lorena Feijóo
Nancy Osbaldeston
Karina Jäger-von Stülpnagel

See also

Belgian culture
Ballet companies
Flemish culture

References

Culture in Antwerp
Ballet companies
Performing groups established in 1969
1969 establishments in Belgium